Buchanan is an unincorporated community in Floyd County, Indiana, in the United States.

History
The community was named for James Buchanan by an admirer of the president.

References

Unincorporated communities in Floyd County, Indiana
Unincorporated communities in Indiana